The 1968–69 FIBA European Cup Winners' Cup was the third edition of FIBA's 2nd-tier level European-wide professional club basketball competition, contested between national domestic cup champions, running from December 1968, to 17 April 1969. 22 teams took part in the competition.

The final, held in Vienna, featured for the first time, two clubs from the Eastern Bloc. Slavia VŠ Praha, which had lost the previous edition's final to AEK, defeated Dinamo Tbilisi, to become the competition's first Czechoslovak League champion.

Participants

First round

|}

Second round

|}

Automatically qualified to the quarter finals
 Dinamo Tbilisi

Quarterfinals

|}

*Originally, Fides Napoli won the first leg by 37 points (98–61), but in the return game in Athens the Italian club withdrew during halftime (Panathinaikos winning then 51–16) as a protest for what they considered a biased refereeing and many irregularities in the scoring procedure (in particular, Fides claimed that the real halftime score should have been 39–28 for Panathinaikos, and also that the first half lasted more than the regulated 20 minutes). However the French FIBA Commissar Edmond Pigeu nor the Secretary General William Jones (who was also present in the outdoor Panathinian Stadium, with more than 25,000 fans crowding the stands) saw anything irregular in this game. Later, FIBA expelled Fides Napoli from the competition and declared Panathinaikos winner by forfeit (2–0).

Semifinals

|}

Final
April 17, Wiener Stadthalle, Vienna

|}

References

External links 
FIBA European Cup Winner's Cup 1968–69 linguasport.com
FIBA European Cup Winner's Cup 1968–69

Cup
FIBA Saporta Cup